Tony Hart may refer to:

 Tony Hart (theater) (1855–1891), American actor, comedian and singer
 Tony Hart (politician) (1923–2009), British businessman and politician
 Tony Hart (1925–2009), British children's television personality and artist
 Tony Hart (businessman) (1932–2020), Jamaican businessman, philanthropist, and politician

See also
 Anthony Hart (c. 1754–1831), British lawyer and politician
 Anthony Hart Harrigan (1925–2010) American conservative columnist, lecturer, and author